Xavier Armange  (born 17 June 1947 in Nantes) is a French writer and illustrator of children's books. After studying literature, he worked in the communications industry and created an advertising agency, while at the same time embarking on a career of writing and illustrating children's books. He has written more than twenty books and albums and also writes in the children's press. In 1995 he established a publishing house in Les Sables-d'Olonne which publishes a dozen books per year.

Bibliography
(English language only)

Find-a-Word in the City
Find-a-Word in the Country
Find-a-Word on Vacation
American edition Derrydale Books, New York City

External links

Biography
Short story
Wikipedia France : https://fr.wikipedia.org/wiki/Xavier_Armange

French children's writers
French illustrators
Writers from Nantes
1947 births
Living people
French male writers